District 137 of the Texas House of Representatives, is located in southwestern Houston, Texas. The district has been represented by Gene Wu since 2013.

Per 2020 census data, the 137th district is one of the most diverse State House Districts in the legislature.

List of representatives

References 

137
Harris County, Texas